André Noyelle (29 November 1931 – 4 February 2003) was a road racing cyclist from Belgium. He won the gold medal in the men's individual road race at the 1952 Summer Olympics in Helsinki, Finland. At the same tournament he also claimed the title in the men's team road race, alongside Robert Grondelaers and Lucien Victor. He was a professional rider from 1953 to 1966.

Major results

1952
 1st  Road race, Olympic Games
 1st  Team road race, Olympic Games (with Robert Grondelaers and Lucien Victor)
 1st  National military road race championships
 2nd Amateur road race, World Road Championships
1953
 3rd Omloop van het Houtland
1955
 1st Stage 1A Trois Jours d'Anvers
 1st Stage 4 Tour de l'Ouest
 2nd Kampioenschap van Vlaanderen
 4th Gent–Wevelgem
1957
 1st Elfstedenronde
 2nd Gent–Wevelgem
 3rd Dwars door Vlaanderen
1958
 3rd Brussels–Ingooigem
 4th Kuurne–Brussels–Kuurne
 10th Gent–Wevelgem
1959
 1st Grand Prix de Fourmies
 2nd Kampioenschap van Vlaanderen
 3rd Paris–Tours
 5th Kuurne–Brussels–Kuurne
 7th Gent–Wevelgem
1960
 3rd Grand Prix d'Isbergues
 9th Kuurne–Brussels–Kuurne
1961
 1st Omloop van Oost-Vlaanderen
 3rd Kuurne–Brussels–Kuurne
 3rd E3 Prijs Vlaanderen
 3rd Züri-Metzgete
 4th Gent–Wevelgem
1962 
 10th Paris–Bruxelles
1963
 5th Gent–Wevelgem
 7th Kuurne–Brussels–Kuurne
1964
 1st Grand Prix Pino Cerami
 2nd Grote Prijs Jef Scherens
 3rd Nokere Koerse
 4th La Flèche Wallonne
1965
 6th Paris–Tours

References

External links
 

1931 births
2003 deaths
Sportspeople from Ypres
Belgian male cyclists
Cyclists at the 1952 Summer Olympics
Olympic cyclists of Belgium
Olympic gold medalists for Belgium
Olympic medalists in cycling
Cyclists from West Flanders
Medalists at the 1952 Summer Olympics
20th-century Belgian people